Fortuna Düsseldorf is a German football club based in Düsseldorf, North Rhine-Westphalia. The following list contains all the footballers that have made over 100 league appearances for the club since 1947. Statistics from before this period are incomplete.

Players
Statistics correct as of the end of the 2012–13 season

References

External links
 Fortuna Düsseldorf - Players from A-Z at worldfootball.net
 Fortuna Düsseldorf at fussballdaten.de 

Players
 
Fortuna Düsseldorf
Association football player non-biographical articles